John E. McCormick (May 20, 1924November 26, 2010) was an American Democratic politician and jurist from Wisconsin.  He was a Wisconsin Circuit Court Judge for thirty years in Milwaukee County.

Biography

Born in Milwaukee, Wisconsin, McCormick served in the United States Army Air Corps during World War II. He graduated from Marquette University Law School in 1951. He was elected to the Wisconsin State Assembly in 1960 and served six terms until he was appointed County Judge in Milwaukee County in 1972.  He was elected to the Wisconsin Circuit Court in Milwaukee County in 1976, and was re-elected every six years until his retirement in 2004.  At the time of his death, he was the longest-serving judge in Milwaukee County history.

Judge McCormick was married to Mary Jo Deppisch for 49 years.  They had nine children.  His wife preceded him in death.

Electoral history

Wisconsin Circuit Court (1975, 1981, 1987, 1993, 1999)

| colspan="6" style="text-align:center;background-color: #e9e9e9;"| General Election, April 1, 1975

| colspan="6" style="text-align:center;background-color: #e9e9e9;"| General Election, April 7, 1981

| colspan="6" style="text-align:center;background-color: #e9e9e9;"| General Election, April 7, 1987

| colspan="6" style="text-align:center;background-color: #e9e9e9;"| General Election, April 6, 1993

| colspan="6" style="text-align:center;background-color: #e9e9e9;"| General Election, April 6, 1999

References

Politicians from Milwaukee
Marquette University Law School alumni
Wisconsin state court judges
1924 births
2010 deaths
20th-century American judges
United States Army Air Forces personnel of World War II
Democratic Party members of the Wisconsin State Assembly